Alan Willey may refer to:

Alan Willey (actor) (1909–1961), Australian-born American leading man; later stage name Alan Marshal
Alan Willey (footballer, born 1941) (1941–2017), English forward
Alan Willey (footballer, born 1956), English striker and American leading soccer player

See also
Alan Wiley (born 1960), English football referee